The Ghana national baseball team, nicknamed the Rising Stars, is the national baseball team of Ghana. They are currently the 3rd team in Africa and the 42nd ranked men's baseball team in the IBAF World Rankings.

In June 2008, US President George W. Bush, Ghanaian Vice-President Aliu Mahama and outgoing US ambassador Pamela Bridgewater were honoured for their work in developing baseball and softball in the country.

The team is controlled by the Ghana Baseball & Softball Federation, which is represented in the African Baseball & Softball Association.

Tournament results

All-Africa Games

References

National baseball teams in Africa
Baseball